The 2011 Nova Scotia Men's Molson Provincial Championship was held February 1–6 at the Dartmouth Curling Club in Dartmouth, Nova Scotia.  The winning team of Shawn Adams represented Nova Scotia at the 2011 Tim Hortons Brier in London, Ontario.

Teams

Draw Brackets

A Event

B Event

C Event

Results
All times AST

Draw 1
February 2, 9:00am

Draw 2
February 2, 2:00pm

Draw 3
February 3, 10:00am

Draw 4
February 3, 3:00pm

Draw 5
February 3, 8:00pm

Draw 6
February 4, 7:30am

Draw 7
February 4, 12:30pm

Draw 8
February 4, 5:15pm

Draw 9
February 4, 9:00pm

Draw 10
February 5, 10:00am

Draw 11
February 5, 3:00pm

Playoffs

1 vs. 2
February 5, 8:00pm

3 vs. 4
February 5, 8:00pm

Semifinal
February 6, 9:00am

Final
February 6, 2:00pm

External links
Livecurling.com Score Tracker
Nova Scotia Curling Association

References

Nova Scotia Mens Molson Provincial Championship, 2011
Curling competitions in Halifax, Nova Scotia
2011 in Nova Scotia